Agnadello (Cremasco:  or ) is a comune and village in the province of Cremona, Lombardy, northern Italy. It was the location of the battle of Agnadello in which Louis XII of France defeated  the Venetians on 14 May 1509.

References

External links

Cities and towns in Lombardy